Into the Legend is the eleventh studio album by the Italian symphonic power metal band Rhapsody of Fire. It was released on 15 January 2016 via AFM Records.

It is the first album with bassist Alessandro Sala, and the final album with longtime members Fabio Lione on vocals and Alex Holzwarth on drums.

Track listing

Personnel 
Rhapsody of Fire
 Fabio Lione – lead vocals
 Roberto De Micheli – guitar
 Alessandro Sala – bass
 Alex Staropoli – keyboards, production
 Alex Holzwarth – drums

Additional musicians
 Manuel Staropoli – recorder, flute, crumhorn, oboe, duduk
 Matteo Brenci – guitars (7)
 Luca Balbo – piano (7)
 Elisa Frausin – cello
 Bayarma Rinchinova – flute
 Teodora Tommasi – harp
 Manuel Tomadin – harpsichord
 Luca Ventimiglia – musette, uillean pipes, crumhorn
 Paolo Monetti – violone
 Macedonian Radio Symphonic Orchestra – orchestra
 Manuela Kriscak, Noémi Boros, Paola Marra – soprano vocals
 Elisa Verzier – alto vocals
 Riccardo Rados – tenor vocals
 Hao Wang, Matjaž Zobec – bass vocals

Choir
 Giacomo Voli, Beatrice Blaskovic, Caterina Lanza, Elisa Blaskovic, Erin Dorci, Sofia Rosie Mayer, Virginia Lanza, Davide Moras, Fabio Sambenini, Gabriele Gozzi, Paolo Ribaldini

Production
 Alberto Bravin – editing, engineering, mixing
 Atanas Babaleski – engineering
 Giorgi Hristovski – engineering
 Fulvio Zafred – engineering
 Maor Appelbaum – mastering
 Felipe Machado Franco – artwork, layout
 Daniele Peluso – photography
 Stefania Seculin – choir conductor
 Vito Lo Re – orchestra conductor

Charts

References

2016 albums
AFM Records albums
Rhapsody of Fire albums